The 1905 Cumberland Bulldogs football team represented Cumberland University in the 1905 Southern Intercollegiate Athletic Association football season. Led by John Counselman in his first and only season as head coach, Cumberland compiled an overall record of 5–4 with a mark of 3–2 in SIAA play.

Schedule

References

Cumberland
Cumberland Phoenix football seasons
Cumberland Bulldogs football